The 1946 Palestine Cup (HaGavia HaEretz-Israeli) was the fourteenth season of Israeli Football Association's nationwide football cup competition.

The defending champion, Beitar Tel Aviv was eliminated in the first round after losing twice to Maccabi Nes Tziona. Hapoel Tel Aviv had difficulties throughout the competition, losing a match in the first round to minnows Hapoel Givatayim, and barely making it through the next round against Maccabi Rehovot, finally crashing to Hapoel Rishon LeZion in the quarter finals.

Maccabi Tel Aviv and Hapoel Rishon LeZion met in the two-legged final, Maccabi winning both legs to obtain its 5th cup.

Format
For this season, each round was played over two legs, based on the Mitropa Cup. The change in format was caused by disagreements between Hapoel and Maccabi factions within the EIFA, which prevented any EIFA activities until March 1946. As the disagreement was settled in March, the EIFA decided to expand the cup competitions to two matches per round, to allow the teams more matches to play.

Results

First  round

|}

Deciding match

Second round

|}

Deciding matches

Quarter-finals

|}

Semi-finals

|}

Finals

First leg

Second leg

Maccabi Tel Aviv won 6–2 on aggregate.

Notes

References
100 Years of Football 1906-2006, Elisha Shohat (Israel), 2006

External links
 Israel Football Association website 

Israel State Cup
Cup
Israel State Cup seasons